Ana Garcia-Arcicollar Vallejo (born 28 May 1982) is a teacher and a vision impaired B2/S12 swimmer from Spain. She has a vision impairment because of a congenital disease.  She competed at the 1996 Summer Paralympics, winning a bronze in the 4 X 100 meter medley 49 points S11 - S13 race, the 200 meter breaststroke race and the 100 meter backstroke race. She competed at the 2000 Summer Paralympics in Sydney, Australia, winning a silver in the 400 meter freestyle race, and a bronze in the 100 meter butterfly race.  She competed at the 2004 Summer Paralympics, winning a gold in the 400 meter freestyle race, and a bronze in the 100 meter butterfly race. She competed at the 2008 Summer Paralympics, winning a silver in the 100 meter butterfly race. She also raced at the IBSA World Games in Sao Paulo, Brazil. She raced at the 2006  World Swimming Championship in Durban, South Africa and the  II IBSA World Blind Championships in 2003 in Quebec, Canada. She set world records in the 2003 races in the 4 X 50 meter Freestyle S11 - S13 race, the 800 meter freestyle S12 race and the 4 X 50 meter medley S11 - S13 race.

Notes

References

External links 
 
 

1982 births
Living people
Spanish female backstroke swimmers
Spanish female butterfly swimmers
Spanish female breaststroke swimmers
Spanish female freestyle swimmers
Paralympic swimmers of Spain
Paralympic gold medalists for Spain
Paralympic silver medalists for Spain
Paralympic bronze medalists for Spain
Paralympic medalists in swimming
Swimmers at the 1996 Summer Paralympics
Swimmers at the 2000 Summer Paralympics
Swimmers at the 2004 Summer Paralympics
Swimmers at the 2008 Summer Paralympics
Medalists at the 1996 Summer Paralympics
Medalists at the 2000 Summer Paralympics
Medalists at the 2004 Summer Paralympics
Medalists at the 2008 Summer Paralympics
Swimmers from Madrid
S12-classified Paralympic swimmers
Medalists at the World Para Swimming Championships
21st-century Spanish women